The Hanle effect, also known as zero-field level crossing, is a reduction in the polarization of light when the atoms emitting the light are subject to a magnetic field in a particular direction, and when they have themselves been excited by polarized light.

Experiments which utilize the Hanle effect include measuring the lifetime of excited states, and detecting the presence of magnetic fields.

History
The first experimental evidence for the effect came from Robert W. Wood, and Lord Rayleigh. The effect is named after Wilhelm Hanle, who was the first to explain the effect, in terms of classical physics, in Zeitschrift für Physik in 1924. Initially, the causes of the effect were controversial, and many theorists mistakenly thought it was a version of the Faraday effect. Attempts to understand the phenomenon were important in the subsequent development of quantum physics.

An early theoretical treatment of level crossing effect was given by Gregory Breit.

Applications

Observation of the Hanle effect on the light emitted by the sun is used to indirectly measure the magnetic fields within the sun, see:
 Polarization in astronomy
 Imaging spectroscopy

The effect was initially considered in the context of gasses, followed by applications to solid state physics. It has been used to measure both the states of localized electrons and free electrons. For spin-polarized electrical currents, the Hanle effect provides a way to measure the effective spin lifetime in a particular device.

Related effects
The zero-field Hanle level crossings involve magnetic fields, in which the states which are degenerate at zero magnetic field are split due to the Zeeman effect. There is also the closely analogous zero-field Stark level crossings with electric fields, in which the states which are degenerate at zero electric field are split due to the Stark effect. Tests of zero field Stark level crossings came after the Hanle-type measurements, and are generally less common, due to the increased complexity of the experiments.

See also
 Larmor precession
 Resonance fluorescence
 Optical pumping

References

Atomic physics
Magnetism
Foundational quantum physics
Physical phenomena